This is a list of National Historic Sites in Kingston, Ontario.  There are 22 National Historic Sites designated in Kingston, including the Rideau Canal which extends from Ottawa and traverses  to Kingston.  The following sites are administered by Parks Canada: Bellevue House, Kingston Fortifications, the Rideau Canal and Shoal Tower (identified below by the beaver icon ).   Fort Henry and Fort Frontenac were both designated in 1923 and were the first sites designated in Kingston.

Numerous National Historic Events also occurred in Kingston, and are identified at places associated with them, using the same style of federal plaque which marks National Historic Sites. Several National Historic Persons are commemorated throughout the city in the same way. The markers do not indicate which designation—a Site, Event, or Person—a subject has been given.

National Historic Sites located elsewhere in Ontario are listed at National Historic Sites in Ontario.

This list uses names designated by the national Historic Sites and Monuments Board, which may differ from other names for these sites.

National Historic Sites

See also
List of historic places in Kingston, Ontario

References

 
Kingston
National Historic Sites of Canada
Buildings and structures in Kingston, Ontario